Rio Acre Ecological Station is an ecological station in the state of Acre, Brazil.

Location

It is administered by the Chico Mendes Institute for Biodiversity Conservation.
The ecological station lies in the municipalities of Assis Brasil and Sena Madureira in the state of Acre. 
It contains Amazon forest bounded to the north by an Indian reservation and to the south by the Acre River.

Environment

The vegetation is characterized by open forests of palms and bamboos.
255 species of birds have been found in the alluvial forests, and 189 species in the open forests.
The first occurrence in Brazil of several species of birds was first recorded in the ecological station, including sapphire-spangled emerald (Amazilia lactea), Guianan warbling antbird (Hypocnemis cantator), buff-fronted foliage-gleaner (Philydor rufum), wedge-billed woodcreeper (Glyphorynchus spirurus), Tschudi's woodcreeper (Xiphorhynchus ocellatus chunchotambo) and russet-backed oropendola (Psarocolius angustifrons).

The station is rich in species of amphibian, including about 40% of all the species recorded in the state of Acre.
The yellow-spotted river turtle is found in small numbers, but is subject to increasing pressure from people hunting the eggs.
44 species of terrestrial mammals have been recorded, including the threatened giant armadillo (Priodontes maximus), giant anteater (Myrmecophaga tridactyla), Peruvian spider monkey (Ateles chamek), Goeldi's marmoset (Callimico goeldii), South American tapir (Tapirus terrestris), neotropical otter (Lontra longicaudis), margay (Leopardus wiedii), jaguar (Panthera onca) and cougar (Puma concolor).

Conservation

The Ecological Station is a "strict nature reserve" under IUCN protected area category Ia.
It was created to preserve the headwaters of the Acre River and to promote research.
The conservation unit is supported by the Amazon Region Protected Areas Program.

References

Sources

1981 establishments in Brazil
Ecological stations of Brazil
Protected areas of Acre (state)
Protected areas established in 1981